Mimothrips is a genus of thrips in the family Phlaeothripidae.

Species
 Mimothrips hargreavesi
 Mimothrips longicornis
 Mimothrips orientalis

References

Phlaeothripidae
Thrips
Thrips genera